This is a list of the Austria national football team results from 1980 to 1999.

1980

1981

1982

1983

1984

1985

1986

1987

1988

1989

1990

1991

1992

1993

1994

1995

1996

1997

1998

1999

Appearances and goals

External links
Results at RSSSF 
Details at EU Football.net

1980s in Austria
1990s in Austria
Austria national football team results